Harold Lyman Ryan (June 17, 1923 – April 10, 1995) was an attorney and United States district judge of the United States District Court for the District of Idaho.

Education 
Born and raised in Weiser, Idaho, Ryan graduated from Weiser High School in 1941, and attended the University of Idaho in Moscow from 1941 to 1943, then enlisted in the 

Ryan returned to the University of Idaho in 1946, and entered its College of Law, graduating in January 1950 with a Bachelor of Laws.

Early career
Ryan was admitted to the Idaho State Bar in 1950, and returned to Weiser to practice law with his father,  He served as a deputy prosecutor of Washington County from 1951 to 1952, and was elected to the Idaho state senate in 1962 and served from 1963 to 1966.

While in the state senate, Ryan took a particular interest in modernizing the Idaho judiciary and served as Chairman of the Joint Commission of the Idaho Legislature which instituted sweeping reform by reorganizing and modernizing the state judicial system, creating a court administration, and forming the Idaho Judicial Council. He also served as president of the Idaho state bar from 1967 to 1969.

Federal judicial service
After serving as campaign director for Senator Jim McClure in 1978, McClure recommended Ryan to President Ronald Reagan in July 1981 to fill a seat on the U.S. District Court vacated by Judge Raymond McNichols. He was nominated by President Reagan on December 7, confirmed by the Senate on December 16, and received commission on December 17, 1981.

Ryan served as Chief Judge from 1988 to 1992, then assumed senior status on December 30, 1992, and continued until his death from cancer on April 10,  He is buried at Morris Hill Cemetery in Boise.

Notable cases 
In the spring of 1982, recaptured fugitive spy Christopher Boyce was sentenced by Ryan to three years for his escape and to 25 years for bank robbery, conspiracy, and breaking federal gun laws.
In the mid-1980s, Ryan ruled in favor of inmate Walter "Bud" Balla and others that conditions in the state prison violated their constitutional rights. He imposed a cap on inmate population which necessitated the construction of a new maximum security facility.
In early 1991, Ryan issued the bench warrant for Randy Weaver, which led to the Ruby Ridge standoff in August 1992.

References

External links 
 Harold Lyman Ryan at the Biographical Directory of Federal Judges, a public domain publication of the Federal Judicial Center.

Judges of the United States District Court for the District of Idaho
United States district court judges appointed by Ronald Reagan
20th-century American judges
United States Navy personnel of World War II
University of Idaho alumni
People from Weiser, Idaho
Military personnel from Idaho
Republican Party Idaho state senators
Idaho lawyers
American prosecutors
1923 births
1995 deaths
University of Idaho College of Law alumni
20th-century American politicians